Codonosigidae were a Choanoflagellate family. In the newest taxonomy the family Codonsigidae is replaced by the Salpingoecidae.

References

Opisthokont families
Choanoflagellatea